Aston Inn, also known as the Ratner Residence, is a historic inn located at Indianapolis, Marion County, Indiana.  It was built in 1852, and is a two-story, Greek Revival style brick dwelling with an early one-story addition.  It has a side gable roof and features a two-story gallery on the south elevation.  The house was used as a stagecoach stop for a short period in the 1850s.

It was added to the National Register of Historic Places in 1985.

References

Houses on the National Register of Historic Places in Indiana
Greek Revival architecture in Indiana
Houses completed in 1852
Houses in Indianapolis
National Register of Historic Places in Indianapolis
1852 establishments in Indiana